JFJ may refer to:

Jews for Jesus, a Christian evangelical organization based in San Francisco, California
John Ferguson, Jr., ice hockey executive
Jewish Funds for Justice, a national Jewish foundation